National Museum of Military History may refer to:

 National Museum of Military History (Bulgaria), a museum in Sofia, Bulgaria
 National Museum of Military History (Luxembourg), a museum in Diekirch, Luxembourg
 South African National Museum of Military History, a museum in Johannesburg, South Africa